Ujan Ganger Naiya is a drama series with underlying messages on the negative aspects of early marriages and underage pregnancy which was broadcast in 2014 by the BBC Media Action (BBCMA) Bangladesh. It was premiered on the state-owned television channel BTV and primarily targeted the rural populace of the country. The series was received exceedingly well, reaching 35 million people.

Episodes
The 16-episode first series is directed by Giasuddin Selim and Bashar Georgis and written by Giasuddin Selim and a team of writers.  The crew and cast features star performers like Mamunur Rashid, Fazlur Rahman Babu, Wahida Mollick Jolly, Chanchal Chowdhury, Dipa Khondokar, Orchita Sporshia, Quazi Nawshaba Ahmed, Shamol Mawla, Shahed Ali, Momena Chowdhury and many more.

Ujan Ganger Naiya is part of the BBC Agomoni (health project brand of BBC Media Action in Bangladesh) under which BBC Media Action is producing TV shows, radio programmes and Public Service Announcements.

Plot
The plot centres around young sisters Jasmin and Anika, who are married to two brothers. 16-year-old Anika wants to continue her education and struggles to adapt to life as a wife and daughter-in-law. Through her story, the drama explores the challenges of early marriage and pregnancy. The series also attempts to promote healthier practices related to childbirth, such as having a skilled healthcare worker present at delivery. Season two follows Anika a few years later at she works as a healthcare worker in a different rural community.

Cast
For first season 16 episodes 
 Haider= Mamunur Rashid
 Sultan = Fazlur Rahman Babu
 Dadi= Ishrat Nishat
 Sayeda = Wahida Mollick Jolly
 Salma=Shilpi Akter Apu
 Arif=Chanchal Chowdhury
 Halim=Shamol Mawla
 Anika = Orchita Sporshia
 Mou = Marufa Akter Jui
 Rupa= Shamima Nazneen
 Marufa=Deepa Khandakar
 Lata= Sadika Swarna
 Jahir=Shahed Ali
 Shahzada=Jisan
 Banu=Shelly Ahsan
 Sobhan=Pankaj Mazumder
 Rahela= Shirin Shahed Seunti
 Bacchu= Md. Iqbal Hossain
 Rashid= Anowarul Haque

References

Bangladeshi drama television series
BBC Television shows
Bangladeshi television shows
2010s Bangladeshi television series
2014 Bangladeshi television series debuts
Bangladesh Television original programming